Fernão Lopes (died 1545) was the first known permanent inhabitant of the remote Island of Saint Helena in the South Atlantic Ocean, an island that later became famous as the site of Napoleon's exile and death.

Lopes was a 16th-century Portuguese soldier in India. He was tortured and disfigured in punishment for defecting to the side of Rasul Khan when the Portuguese conquered Goa in 1510. On his way home to Portugal after these events, Lopes chose voluntary exile on Saint Helena, where he lived in almost complete solitude for more than 30 years.

In Portuguese service

In 1510 Lopes, a minor nobleman and soldier, accompanied the Portuguese governor of India, Afonso de Albuquerque, on his conquest of Goa on the west coast of India. Shortly after its conquest, Albuquerque set sail to conquer Malacca in Malaysia, leaving Lopes behind as part of the garrison, with orders to keep the peace and rule over the local population. When Albuquerque returned nearly two years later, he found Goa under siege and some of the men had defected to the enemy side, and some, including Lopes himself, had married native women and converted to Islam.

Albuquerque's men regained possession of the territory and Rasul Khan surrendered the Portuguese renegades on the condition that their lives be spared. Instead they were tortured so savagely that half of them died within three days. Lopes, as the leader of the group, received the harshest punishment. He was bound with ropes to two wooden posts, and Albuquerque's men severed his nose, ears, right arm, and left thumb (according to others, his index and middle fingers as well) in a public square. His hair and beard were scraped off with clam shells. The survivors were then released, and fled to the jungle where they could hide their deformities and be left alone.

Lopes stayed in Goa until the death of Albuquerque in 1515, after which he set sail for Portugal, having been offered amnesty by King Manuel I. The ship stopped at Saint Helena for food and water. Saint Helena was discovered by the Portuguese João da Nova in 1502, and with its abundance of fresh water and fat tame birds, it became a regular port of call for Portuguese ships en route between the East Indies and Europe via the Cape of Good Hope. According to one source, Lopes went on land secretly and became utterly alone; according to another source he was landed with a boat and stayed on the island with a number of slaves. According to all sources, Lopes was granted a few supplies from the ship's stores.

Marooned on Saint Helena

Nearly a year passed before another ship docked at Saint Helena. The climate was tropical and mild, tempered by trade winds. At the time, Saint Helena's original ecosystem was almost intact, and goats introduced by the Portuguese thrived in the island's untouched environment (no mammals or reptiles inhabited Saint Helena before introduction by explorers). The interior of Saint Helena was a thick old-growth forest of ancient gumwood trees and other native plants that had colonized the island as many as 10 million years ago.

The following is from a contemporary account of the first ship to encounter Lopes after he had been left on Saint Helena, found in a Hakluyt Society journal:

The cockerel that Lopes saved from the ship became his only friend on Saint Helena. During the night, it roosted above his head and during the day it followed behind him, and would come if he called to it. As time went on, Lopes began to be less and less afraid of people. When a ship would lay anchor in what would later be known as Jamestown harbour, Lopes would greet the sailors, talking to them as they came ashore. Lopes began to be considered something of a saint, because of his deformities and the fact that he would not leave Saint Helena for any reason. Many people thought him to be the embodiment of human suffering and alienation, and they took pity on him. The travelers who stopped at the island gave Lopes many things, including livestock and seeds. Eventually, Lopes became a gardener and a keeper of livestock, working the soil, planting fruit trees, grasses and many other forms of vegetation.

Lopes visits Portugal and Rome
After 10 years on the island, Lopes agreed to return to Portugal to see his family, visited King João III and then traveled to Rome, where Pope Clement VII absolved him of the sin of apostasy. The absolution occurred at Easter, 1530, in public (In those days, only the Pope could absolve the sin of apostasy, and he always did so in public, at Easter). The Pope was very impressed with Lopes, and decided to grant him a wish. Lopes had one desire, and that was to return to his home on the Island of Saint Helena. The Pope sent Lopes back to Portugal with a letter for João III, requesting that Lopes be transported back to Saint Helena. Lopes returned to the island and died there in 1545, after another 20 years of almost complete solitude.

References

Further reading

External links
Historical Chronology of Saint Helena
Fernão Lopes: The First Robinson Crusoe
Chapter 2 of Brooke's 1808 History of the Island of St. Helena

Portuguese Roman Catholics
Converts to Roman Catholicism from Islam
1545 deaths
Castaways
Saint Helenian people of Portuguese descent
Mercenaries in India
16th-century Portuguese people
Year of birth unknown